Daniel Pender was a Royal Navy Staff Commander, later captain, who surveyed the Coast of British Columbia aboard ,  and  from 1857 to 1870.

Pender was recorded as the second master of the admiralty survey vessel, HMS Plumper, in 1857 when he arrived at Esquimalt. He was promoted as the ship's master in 1860. He was, however, transferred to HMS Hecate a year later after the Plumper was deemed too small and unsuitable for the coast's waters. When the British government commissioned the Hudson Bay Company to continue the hydraulic survey of the coast, he was given command of the company's Beaver. He replaced Captain George Henry Richards, who was recalled to Britain after he was appointed as the Hydrographer of the Royal Navy.

Legacy

Pender Harbour, a harbour and group of communities on the Sunshine Coast of British Columbia, Canada, are named for Pender, as are North and South Pender Islands in the Southern Gulf Islands and various placenames associated with those islands.  Farther north are also a Mount Pender on Campania Island and a Pender Point on Neroutsos Inlet. The Pender Harbour area also includes a Mount Daniel, a Daniel Point and a Pender Hill; all three are parkland.

References

Royal Navy officers
Pre-Confederation British Columbia people